The flag of Somalia, also known as the Somali flag, was adopted on October 12, 1954, and was designed by Mohammed Awale Liban. The flag was initially used within the Trust Territory of Somaliland before being adopted by the short-lived State of Somaliland and the Somali Republic. It is an ethnic flag for the Somali people; the flag's five-pointed star represents the five regions in which Somalis reside.

History

Beginning in the mid-19th century, areas in the Horn of Africa populated by Somalis were divided among Ethiopia, France, Britain, and Italy.
The flag of Somalia was created in 1954 for the transitional trusteeship period of the nation's history. It was personally designed by the Somali scholar Mohammed Awale Liban, who was from the northern eastern side of Somalia after being selected to come up with a design in preparation for independence. The flag was also used in the short-lived independent State of Somaliland between 26 June 1960 and 1 July 1960.

In Somaliland 
Public display of the Somali flag is strictly prohibited in Somaliland.

Characteristics
As an ethnic flag, the five-pointed white Star of Unity in its center represents the areas where the Somali ethnic group form the majority: Djibouti, Somaliland (former British protectorate), the Somali region in Ethiopia, the North Eastern Province in Kenya, and Somalia (Italian Somaliland). However, the flag does not represent all the Somali regions anymore, going from an ethnic flag to the national flag of Somalia only. It now officially denotes the sky as well as the Gulf of Aden, Guardafui Channel and the Somali Sea, which flank the country.

Construction
The flag of Somalia can be reproduced using the following construction plan:

Colours scheme

Historical flags
The following are the flags historically used in the territory of present-day Somalia:

Pre-colonial states

Italian Somalia

British Somaliland

Subnational flags

Federal member states

See also

List of Somali flags
Flag of Bosnia & Herzegovina
Flag of Djibouti
Flag of Somaliland
Flag of Israel
Flag of Kosovo
Soomaaliyeey toosoo
Qolobaa Calankeed
History of Somalia
History of Somaliland
Flag of Morocco, a nearly similar flag
Flag of Vietnam, a similar flag
Bonnie Blue Flag, a similar flag
Flag of the Republic of West Florida

Notes

References

Flag
Flags of Africa
Flags introduced in 1954
Somali culture
National flags
Flags of Somalia
1954 establishments in Somalia